Andres Miguel Formento (born 18 May 1984) is an Argentine former professional footballer who played as a centre forward.

Career 
His professional career began in the lower divisions of Colón de Santa Fe during 1992–2002. Manchester City showed interest in him in 2001, but he remained at Santa Fe, as he was considered a vital player. He has played in the Portuguese league, and in Spain. In 2008, he was signed by PSMS Medan in Indonesia. In the same year, he signed with a German soccer team.

References

External links 

1984 births
3. Liga players
Argentine footballers
Association football forwards
Categoría Primera A players
Club Atlético Colón footballers
Deportes Quindío footballers
La Equidad footballers
Living people
PSMS Medan players
Sport Huancayo footballers
SSV Jahn Regensburg players
Tiro Federal footballers
Peruvian Primera División players
Wuppertaler SV players
Atlético Clube de Portugal players
Argentine expatriate footballers
Argentine expatriate sportspeople in Colombia
Expatriate footballers in Colombia
Argentine expatriate sportspeople in Germany
Expatriate footballers in Germany
Argentine expatriate sportspeople in Indonesia
Expatriate footballers in Indonesia
Argentine expatriate sportspeople in Peru
Expatriate footballers in Peru
Argentine expatriate sportspeople in Spain
Expatriate footballers in Spain
Argentine expatriate sportspeople in Venezuela
Expatriate footballers in Venezuela
People from Catamarca Province